This is a list of teacher education schools in India by state.

Bihar 
 Women's Training College Patna - Patna University
 Amaltas College of Education, Aryabhatta Knowledge University
 Patna Training College Patna - Patna University
 St. Xavier's College of Education
 Dr. S. P. Singh College Of Teacher Education
 Anugrah Memorial B.Ed. College, Gaya
 Rahmani B.Ed. College, Munger
 Islamia teacher training college, Phulbari, Patna

Union Territory of Dadra and Nagar Haveli and Daman and Diu 
 SSR College of Education

Delhi 
 National Institute of Teacher Education, Delhi
 Central Institute Of Education/ Department of Education
 Great Mission Teacher Training Institute, Delhi
 Jamia Millia Islamia, Teacher Training College, Delhi
 Indoss, Teacher Training Institute, Delhi
 Teachers Training Delhi, Asian College of Teachers, Delhi

Gujarat 
 Calrox Teacher's University, Ahmedabad
 Indian Institute of Teacher Education, Gandhinagar
 B.D. Shah College of Teacher Education (C.T.E., MHRD), Modasa, Aravalli

Himachal Pradesh 
 Government College of Teacher Education Dharamsala

Kerala 
 Government College of Teacher Education, Kozhikkode www.gctecalicut.in
 St. Thomas College of Teacher Education, Pala
 T.D Teacher Training Institute, Mattancherry, Kochi-2
 University College of Teacher Education Vaikom

Madhya Pradesh 
 Mahatma Gandhi Chitrakoot Gramoday University
 National Institute of Technical Teachers' Training and Research Bhopal

Mizoram 
College of Teachers Education, Aizawl

Orissa 
 Training Centre for Teachers of the Deaf, Bhubaneswar
Regional Institute of Education, Bhubaneswar

Puducherry 
 Mahé Co-operative College of Teacher Education (MCCTE)

Punjab 
 Desh Bhagat School of Education Desh Bhagat University, Mandi Gobindgarh
 Government College of Education, Chandigarh
 Government Teacher Training College (Chandigarh, India)
 Sri Sai Group of Institutes (Pathankot, Amritsar, Palampur)

Uttarakhand 

 Motiram Baburam Govt. Post Graduate College

Uttar Pradesh 

Saamarthya Teachers Training Academy of Research, (STTAR), Seth Anandram Jaipuria Group
 College of Education- The Glocal University, Saharanpur

Tamil Nadu 
 Aasee College of Education
 Amrita College of Education
 Annai Teresa College of Education, B.Ed. College, Ariyakudi, Sivaganga district
 Anai Angel Teacher Training Institute for Women (Roever's Institute), Perambalur
 Bishop Agniswamy College of Education
 Christian Education College, Perambalur
 Dhanalakshmi Srinivasan B.Ed., Teacher Training College, Perambalur
 Eden Garden Education College, Perambalur
 Elizabeth Education College, Perambalur
 ERK College of Education, Erumiyampatti
 G.E.T B.Ed College, Gudiyattam
 J.R.S college of Education, Perambalur
 J.R.S Teacher Training college, Perambalur
 Roever College Of Education, Perambalur
 Roever Teacher Training For Men, Perambalur
 St. Joseph College of Education
 Stella Matutina College of Education
 Tamil Nadu Teachers Education University
 Srinivasan Teacher Training College, Perambalur
 Swami Vivekanandha Teacher Training Institute, Perambalur
 Thanthai Hans Roever B.Ed., and Teacher Training, Perambalur
 Vidhyaa Giri College of Arts and Science B.Ed, Karaikudi, Sivagangai
 V.O.C. College OF Education, Thoothukudi
 KAPI college of education Nagamalai, Madurai -19
KAPI Women's college of education Nagamalai, Madurai -19

West Bengal 
 Ramakrishna Mission Siksha Mandir
 Vidyasagar Teachers' Training College

See also 
 Bachelor of Education
 Educational programs or approaches
 Agastya International Foundation - a Bangalore-based education trust
 Muktangan - a pioneering educational programme for teacher education
 Xseed education
 National Award for Teachers (India)
 National Council for Teacher Education
 National Council for Teacher Education Act, 1993
 Organization by field of study
 Association of Mathematics Teachers of India
 Association of Pharmaceutical Teachers of India
 Homi Bhabha Centre for Science Education
 Teacher Eligibility Test

References

Further reading 
 Aggarwal, J.C. (1988). National Commission on Teacher I - School Teachers and the National Commission on Teachers II - Higher Education 1983-1985: Major Recommendations. Delhi: Doaba House.
 NCERT Review of Teacher Education in India
 New norms for teacher education mooted
 Panda, B. N. and A.D. Tewari. (2009). Teacher Education. New Delhi: A P H Publishing.
 Professionalization of teacher education in India: A critique of Teacher Education Curriculum reforms and its effectiveness
 Srivastava, R.C. (1997). Teacher Education in India: Issues & Perspectives. Regency Publications.
 Teacher Education in India: An Auxiliary Perspective

External links 
 Indian Institute of Teacher Education
 NCTE : National Council For Teacher Education
 List of All Teachers Training Colleges in India, State & District Wise

 
Lists of universities and colleges in India